Argentino del Valle Larrabure (6 June 1932 – 19 August 1975) was an Argentine military officer.

In 2022, the Holy See authorized his case in order to start a formal canonization process.

Military career and death
As Lieutenant Colonel, he was vice director of the Military Factory of Guns and Explosives in Villa María, Córdoba and was kidnapped by the Marxist guerrilla organization People's Revolutionary Army (ERP) during an assault and jailed in a "people's prison" by the ERP during 372 days until his death. 

According to the Argentine Army and many sources, he was killed by the organization; nevertheless, members of the ERP claim he committed suicide. The investigation never concluded and Larraburu's family started a campaign to resolve and condemn the perpetrators. After the opening of many processes against military officers during the Dirty War, the family wanted the calification of crimes against humanity for the kidnappers, but was denied by a court.

Personal life and legacy
He was born in Tucumán into a family of Basque origins and studied at the Colegio Militar de la Nación as infantry officer. He is subject of many tributes by the Argentine Army, who promoted him post-mortem to Colonel rank.

See also
List of kidnappings

References

1932 births
1975 deaths
Argentine Army officers
Argentine murder victims
Kidnapped Argentine people
People murdered in Argentina
20th-century Roman Catholic martyrs